Lea Laboratory is a historic laboratory building located on the original campus of Wake Forest University at Wake Forest, Wake County, North Carolina.  It was designed by noted Baltimore architect John Appleton Wilson (1851–1927) and built in 1887–1888. It consists of a two-story pedimented central brick block, three bays wide and seven deep flanked by one-story pedimented brick wings.  The building has a blend of Colonial Revival and Victorian design elements.  It is the oldest remaining building on the original campus of Wake Forest University, now Southeastern Baptist Theological Seminary, and was one of the first chemical laboratories constructed on a Southern college campus.

It was listed on the National Register of Historic Places in 1975.  It is located in the Wake Forest Historic District.

References

University and college buildings on the National Register of Historic Places in North Carolina
Colonial Revival architecture in North Carolina
Victorian architecture in North Carolina
School buildings completed in 1888
Houses in Wake County, North Carolina
National Register of Historic Places in Wake County, North Carolina
Historic district contributing properties in North Carolina